Făget may refer to several places in Romania:

Făget, a town in Timiș County
 Făget, a village in Valea Lungă Commune, Alba County
 Făget, a village in Ghimeș-Făget Commune, Bacău County
 Făget, a village in Breasta Commune, Dolj County
 Făget, a village in Drajna Commune, Prahova County
Făget mine, a large mine in Rodna, Bistrița-Năsăud County
 Făget, a tributary of the river Izvorul Alb in Bacău County

See also
Faget (disambiguation)
Făgetu (disambiguation)
Făgețel (disambiguation)